Cartier Slough Wildlife Management Area at  is an Idaho wildlife management area in Madison County west of Rexburg. The Army Corps of Engineers and Bureau of Reclamation acquired land for the WMA in 1976 and 1977 as mitigation for the Teton and Ririe dams. 

The WMA is located along the Henry Fork of the Snake River and provides habitat for waterfowl and over 200 wildlife species. Large game that can be seen in the WMA include moose, elk, and mule and white-tailed deer.

References

Protected areas established in 1976
Protected areas of Madison County, Idaho
Wildlife management areas of Idaho
1976 establishments in Idaho